Cara Speller is a British producer of film and television. She is best known for producing animated film Pear Cider and Cigarettes and for Pearl as an executive producer. Both films received Best Animated Short Film nomination; Speller was nominated for Pear Cider and Cigarettes as well as director Robert Valley.

Filmography
 2022 - The Boy, the Mole, the Fox and the Horse (animated film)
 2019-2020 - 101 Dalmatian Street (TV Series) (executive producer)
 2017 - Gorillaz - Saturnz Barz (video) (producer)
 2016 - Pear Cider and Cigarettes (Documentary short) (producer) 
 2016 - Pearl (Short) (executive producer: passion pictures)  
 2013 - Rollin' Christmas (Short) (producer)  
 2011 - Reindeer (Documentary short) (executive producer)  
 2010 - MTV World Stage: Gorillaz (TV Movie) (executive producer)  
 2010 - Gorillaz Featuring Mos Def and Bobby Womack: Stylo (Video short) (producer)  
 2008 - Phoo Action (TV Movie) (consulting producer)  
 2008 - Bananaz (Documentary) (executive producer: Gorillaz)  
 2006 - Gorillaz: Phase Two - Slowboat to Hades (Video) (executive producer: Gorillaz)  
 2006 - Gorillaz: Live in Manchester (TV Special) (executive producer: Gorillaz)  
 2006 - The 48th Annual Grammy Awards (TV Special) (executive producer: Gorillaz)  
 2005 - MTV Europe Music Awards 2005 (TV Special) (executive producer: Gorillaz)

Awards and nominations

References

External links
 Carla Speller at Passion Pictures 
 

Living people
British animators
British producers
British animated film producers
British women film producers
British women animators
Year of birth missing (living people)